Kalyan Chauhan is a former member of the Gujarat Legislative Assembly from the Dahegam constituency.

References

Gujarat MLAs 2007–2012
Bharatiya Janata Party politicians from Gujarat
Living people
Year of birth missing (living people)